Z. japonica  may refer to:
 Zostera japonica, a seagrass species in the genus Zostera
 Zoysia japonica, a creeping grass species in the genus Zoysia native to southeastern and eastern Asia

Synonyms
 Zelkova japonica var. verschaffeltii, a synonym for Zelkova × verschaffeltii, the cut-leaf zelkova, a plant cultivar of hybrid origin
 Zosterops japonica, a synonym for Zosterops japonicus, the Japanese white-eye or mejiro, a small passerine bird species native to east Asia, including Japan, China, Vietnam and the Philippines

See also
 Japonica (disambiguation)